Annu Rani (born 28 August 1992) is an Indian javelin thrower from Bahadurpur, Meerut, Uttar Pradesh. She was the 1st Indian to reach the finals of women's javelin throw event in the World Athletics Championships, Doha, 2019. Annu had qualified for the 2020 Tokyo Olympics through world rankings after missing out on the Olympic Qualification mark. Her career best effort is 63.24m which helped her win the gold in the National Interstate Athletic Championship, Patiala, 2021.In the 2022 Birmingham Commonwealth Games, Annu Rani scripted history as she became the first Indian female javelin thrower to win a medal, a bronze.

Personal life and background
Annu Rani was born on 28 August 1992 in a dhankhar Jat family in Bahadurpur village Uttar Pradesh. Her talent was identified by her brother, Upendra, who noticed her upper body strength during a cricket game. He began to train her by asking her to hurl sugarcane sticks in an empty field. Annu's first javelin stick was one that she crafted herself from a long piece of bamboo, because she couldn't afford one. She started playing javelin throw first in the year 2010 at the age of 18. Her brother later began to pay for her training as well, despite her father's disapproval at girls pursuing sports. He finally came around to supporting Annu's talent after she proved herself by breaking the national record in 2014, and now supports her ambition.

Professional achievements
Annu Rani was initially coached by Kashinath Naik and is now coached by Baljeet Singh.

In the 2014 National Inter-State Athletics Championship in Lucknow, Rani won the gold medal with a throw of 58.83 metres, breaking a 14-year-old national record and qualifying her for the 2014 Commonwealth Games where she finished eighth. Later in the year, she won the bronze medal at the Asian Games in Incheon, South Korea, with a throw of 59.53 metres. Two years later she broke her own record again at the National Inter-state Athletics Championship with a throw of 60.01 metres. In March 2019, she broke her own record again with a throw of 62.34 meters at the National Senior Athletics Championships in Patiala, Punjab.

Rani won the silver medal at the 23rd Asian Athletics Championships in Qatar on 21 April 2019, which qualified for the World Athletics Championship, becoming the first Indian woman javelin thrower to participate in World Athletics Championship. She won the bronze medal at the IAAF World Challenge event Golden Spike Ostrava in Ostrava, Czech Republic.

She won the Sportstar Aces Sportswoman of the Year Award in Athletics in 2020. She won the gold medal in the women's javelin throw event at the 59th National Open Athletics Championship.

References

External links

Annu Rani at Olympics

1992 births
Living people
Indian female javelin throwers
21st-century Indian women
21st-century Indian people
Sportspeople from Meerut
Athletes (track and field) at the 2020 Summer Olympics
Olympic athletes of India
Olympic female javelin throwers
Athletes (track and field) at the 2014 Commonwealth Games
Athletes (track and field) at the 2022 Commonwealth Games
Commonwealth Games bronze medallists for India
Commonwealth Games medallists in athletics
Asian Games medalists in athletics (track and field)
Athletes (track and field) at the 2014 Asian Games
Athletes (track and field) at the 2018 Asian Games
Sportswomen from Uttar Pradesh
Asian Games bronze medalists for India
Medalists at the 2014 Asian Games
Athletes from Uttar Pradesh
South Asian Games silver medalists for India
South Asian Games medalists in athletics
Medallists at the 2022 Commonwealth Games